The First Lady is an American anthology drama television series created by Aaron Cooley which premiered on Showtime on April 17, 2022. It stars Michelle Pfeiffer, Viola Davis, and Gillian Anderson, among others, and portrays life and family events of three First Ladies of the United States: Eleanor Roosevelt, Betty Ford, and Michelle Obama. The series received mixed reviews, with praise for Pfeiffer's and Anderson's performances, as well as the costuming, set design, and themes, but criticism for its pacing, plot, and Davis's performance. In August 2022, the series was canceled after one season.

Cast and characters

Main
 Viola Davis as Michelle Obama, first lady (2009–2017)
 Jayme Lawson as young Michelle Obama
 Michelle Pfeiffer as Betty Ford, first lady (1974–1977)
 Kristine Froseth as young Betty Ford
 Gillian Anderson as Eleanor Roosevelt, first lady (1933–1945)
 Eliza Scanlen as young Eleanor Roosevelt
 O-T Fagbenle as Barack Obama, 44th president of the United States (2009–2017)
 Julian De Niro as young Barack Obama
 Dakota Fanning as Susan Ford
 Arlo Mertz as young Susan Ford
 Lily Rabe as Lorena Hickok
 Regina Taylor as Marian Shields Robinson
 Kiefer Sutherland as Franklin D. Roosevelt, 32nd President of the United States (1933–1945)
 Charlie Plummer as young Franklin D. Roosevelt
 Aaron Eckhart as Gerald Ford, 38th President of the United States (1974–1977)
 Jake Picking as young Gerald Ford

Recurring

Episodes

Production

Development 
On February 5, 2020, it was announced that Showtime had given the production, then known as First Ladies, a series order. Executive producers were expected to include Viola Davis, Julius Tennon, Cathy Schulman, Jeff Gaspin, Brad Kaplan, and Aaron Cooley, who also created the series and will write. Davis would star as Michelle Obama. In January 2021, Michelle Pfeiffer, Jayme Lawson, and Kristine Froseth joined the cast of the series as Betty Ford, young Obama, and young Ford, respectively, with Susanne Bier set to direct and executive produce. That same month, Pamela Adlon and Rhys Wakefield joined the cast.

On February 16, 2021, Aaron Eckhart joined the cast as President Gerald Ford. That same month, Judy Greer replaced Adlon due to scheduling conflicts. On February 22, 2021, it was announced that Gillian Anderson would portray Eleanor Roosevelt. Three days later, on February 25, 2021, it was announced that O. T. Fagbenle would portray President Barack Obama. Dakota Fanning was announced to have joined the cast as Susan Ford on March 2, 2021. On March 9, 2021, Lexi Underwood joined the cast as Malia Obama in a recurring role.

On March 10, 2021, nine more joined the cast, including Derek Cecil as Donald Rumsfeld, Aya Cash as Esther Liebowitz, Jake Picking as Gerald Ford (young), Cayden Boyd as Michael Ford, Marc Hills as Jack Ford, Ben Cook as Steven Ford, Leslie Kritzer as Martha Graham, Thomas E. Sullivan as Bill Warren, and Patrice Johnson Chevannes as Clara Powell.

On April 13, 2021, Regina Taylor joined the cast in a series regular role as Marian Shields Robinson, while Saniyya Sidney, Julian De Niro and Evan Parke joined the cast in recurring roles as Sasha Obama, young Barack Obama and SS Allen Taylor, respectively. In June 2021, Gloria Reuben and Kate Mulgrew joined the cast as Valerie June Jarrett and Susan Sher, while Rosalind Chao, Michael Potts, Kathleen Garrett and Donna Lynne Champlin joined in recurring capacities.

In July 2021, Kiefer Sutherland and Lily Rabe joined the main cast as Franklin D. Roosevelt and Lorena Hickok, respectively, while Ellen Burstyn, Eliza Scanlen, Cailee Spaeny, Clea DuVall and Charlie Plummer joined the cast in recurring roles. In August 2021, Jackie Earle Haley, Maria Dizzia, and Jeremy Bobb were cast in recurring capacities. The series premiered on April 17, 2022 on Showtime and Paramount+ Internationally in 2022. On August 1, 2022, Showtime canceled the series after one season.

Filming 
On February 25, 2021, it was announced  that filming had begun in Covington, Georgia.

Reception

Critical response
The review aggregator website Rotten Tomatoes reported a 41% approval rating with an average rating of 6.00/10, based on 44 critic reviews. The website's critics consensus reads, "Despite formidable stars and a rich history to draw from, a lack of focus and shallow characterization make The First Lady second-rate television." Metacritic, which uses a weighted average, assigned a score of 50 out of 100 based on 22 critics, indicating "mixed or average reviews".

Accolades

Ratings

References

External links
 
 

2022 American television series debuts
2022 American television series endings
2020s American anthology television series
2020s American drama television series
2020s American LGBT-related drama television series
2020s American political television series
American political drama television series
English-language television shows
Showtime (TV network) original programming
Television series by Lionsgate Television
Television shows filmed in Georgia (U.S. state)
Television shows set in Washington, D.C.
Cultural depictions of first ladies of the United States
Cultural depictions of Hillary Clinton
Cultural depictions of Betty Ford
Cultural depictions of Eleanor Roosevelt
Cultural depictions of Barack Obama
Cultural depictions of Franklin D. Roosevelt
Cultural depictions of George H. W. Bush
Cultural depictions of George W. Bush
Cultural depictions of Gerald Ford
Cultural depictions of Harry S. Truman
Cultural depictions of Theodore Roosevelt
Cultural depictions of Richard Nixon
Cultural depictions of J. Edgar Hoover
Cultural depictions of Dick Cheney
Barbara Bush
Laura Bush
Pat Nixon
Michelle Obama